Robe River may refer to:

 River Robe (Ireland)
 Robe River (Australia)
 Robe River (Ethiopia)

See also
 Robe (disambiguation)